Collingwood Park Power Australian Football Club (nicknamed "The Power") is an Australian rules football club based in Redbank Plains. The club competes in the AFL Queensland and AFL SEQ Juniors leagues.

The Junior teams participate in the AFL SEQ Juniors competition and caters for boys and girls up to Under 16's, including the Auskick program for skills development of our younger players.

The Senior team (established in 2009) competes in the AFLQ: QFA Community Football competition.

Origins
Collingwood Park Power was established in the mid 1980s as the Moreton-Ipswich Gazelles JAFC Inc, and boasts a proud history of several finals appearances, grand finals wins and several local and state representative players.
 
During 1999, the club became formally known as registered under its new name Collingwood Park Power JAFC and gained permission to wear the Port Adelaide pre season Competition jumper.
 
In 2007 the club changed its name to Collingwood Park Power Australian Football Club. And in 2010 "The Power" had kicked off their inaugural senior's campaign.

The power take much pride in their clubhouse facility built by the Ipswich City Council in 2013 and their playing field.

Life members
There are seven life members of the club:
Phil Grieger (dec.), Rex Watts, Bert Fahey, Phil Coombs, Kerryn Coombs, Andrew Coombs, Scott Willoughby.

References

External links
 Collingwood Park AFC website
 Collingwood Park JAFC website

Queensland State Football League clubs
1987 establishments in Australia
Australian rules football clubs established in 1987